Manish Dangi (born 17 September 2001) is a Nepalese professional footballer who plays as a winger for Bahraini team Etehad Al-Reef Club and the Nepal national team.

Early life
Born in Kathmandu, Dangi's family moved to South Korea for better job opportunity. Manish Dangi was raised there and started playing football from 2014.

Youth career
Dangi first started playing football as an  elite academy player from Sinheung middle school U15  when he first moved to South Korea. He began to learn football in earnest in the fall of 2015, but due to regulations for registration as a foreign player it took almost a year for him to play in the league. He officially started to play from summer of 2016.

Club career
After high school graduation, Dangi got calls from several university teams and pro clubs, one of them being Daejeon Hana Citizen where he had trials for 3 days. The club asked Dangi to get a Korean citizenship as he had already stayed in Korea for five years and was a registered player in Korea Football Association (KFA), but Dangi refused.

In 2021, Dangi signed for Biratnagar City for the inaugural season of the Nepal Super League (NSL). He played five games as substitute for Biratnagar.

International career
Dangi had an opportunity to take South Korean citizenship and to play in South Korea, but he rejected it and decided to play for Nepal.

Dangi played for Nepal U-19 in the 2019 SAFF U-18 Championship. He scored against Maldives in the competition. The goal was only the goal scored by Nepal in the tournament. He also appeared for Nepal in 2020 AFC U-19 Championship qualification.

In 2021, Dangi was called to a senior national team camp for the first time. He made his international debut against Iraq on 29 May 2021, and scored a goal. Dangi was selected in Nepal's squad for the 2021 SAFF Championship. On 1 October, Dangi scored the only goal for Nepal in a 1–0 victory over the hosts Maldives.

Dangi was called to a Nepal U-23 for 2022 AFC U-23 Asian Cup qualification. He made his U-23 debut against Indonesia U-23 in friendly game on 22 October 2021.

Career statistics

Club

Notes

International

International goals
Scores and results list Nepal's goal tally first.

References

External links
National Football Teams profile

2001 births
Living people
Nepalese footballers
Nepal youth international footballers
Nepal international footballers
Nepalese expatriate footballers
Association football wingers
Nepal Super League players
Expatriate footballers in South Korea